Pilgrim Presbyterian Church is a historic church building in the Mount Adams neighborhood of Cincinnati, Ohio, United States, near the Ida Street Viaduct.  Built in 1886, it is a Gothic Revival structure built primarily of brick.  Constructed by Mount Adams architect and builder Charles E. Iliff, the church features a two-story rectangular floor plan with a prominent central bell tower.  Among its other distinctive architectural elements are the rose windows in the main gable, pairs of windows on its second floor, and the symmetry evidenced in the overall design of the building.

Although Cincinnati was largely Presbyterian in its early history, Mount Adams was originally a strongly Catholic community; Pilgrim Presbyterian was the first Protestant church of any denomination to be founded in that neighborhood.  Today, the congregation is no longer in existence: the building is now owned by Pilgrim Chapel United Church of Christ, and its name is absent from the roster of the Cincinnati Presbytery of the Presbyterian Church.

In 1980, the former Pilgrim Presbyterian Church was listed on the National Register of Historic Places.  It qualified for inclusion on the Register both because of its distinctive historic architecture and because of its place in local history.

References

External links

Church website
Documentation from the University of Cincinnati

Churches completed in 1886
1880s architecture in the United States
Presbyterian churches in Cincinnati
Former Presbyterian churches in the United States
Gothic Revival church buildings in Ohio
National Register of Historic Places in Cincinnati
Presbyterian churches in Ohio
United Church of Christ churches in Ohio
Mount Adams, Cincinnati